Egerbakta is a village in Heves County, Hungary. As of 2015, it has a population of 1,420, and 1,388 as of the 2021 estimate.

History
The earliest written record of the village dates back to 1261.

Demographics
According the 2011 census, 94.5% of the population were of Hungarian ethnicity and 21.4% were Gypsies (5.5% did not declare; due to dual identities, the total may be higher than 100%). The religious distribution was as follows: Roman Catholic 85%, Reformed 2%, Lutheran 0.2%, non-denominational 3.4%, and 8.8% unknown.

References

Populated places in Heves County